Aghdam is a city in Azerbaijan. It may also refer to:

 Aghdam District, Azerbaijan
 Ağdam, Khojavend, Azerbaijan
 Ağdam, Tovuz, Azerbaijan
 Ağdamkənd, Azerbaijan
 Nasim Najafi Aghdam